is a fighting game series developed by FK Digital and published by Arc System Works.

The first game known as Chaos Code: Sign of Catastrophe was released for Sega's RingWide arcade system board on August 4, 2011. A port for the PlayStation 3 was first released on December 19, 2012, on Hong Kong's PlayStation Network, followed by subsequent home releases in both Japan and North America in 2013 and the PAL region in 2014. A remastered version, Chaos Code: New Sign of Catastrophe, was released on arcades on June 6, 2013, and on PlayStation 4 and Windows on March 15, 2017. It features a new online mode and new characters. The game was ported to the Nintendo Switch and released on March 26, 2020. An arcade version of New Sign of Catastrophe known as Chaos Code: Exact Xeno Attack was ported by eXA-Arcadia in 2020.

This sequel title known as Chaos Code: Next Episode of Xtreme Tempest, was announced at 2018 as an in-work sequel title in Japanese arcades. The finalized title was revealed during Evo Japan 2020. However, FK Digital confirmed on February 9, 2020, that the sequel has been postponed for one year, possibly due to COVID-19 pandemic. A year later on February 18, 2021, the series’ producer, Mickey Lin confirmed on his Twitter that FK Digital has returned to the development of the sequel game. It was announced at Angels of Battle on April 2, 2022, that the Chaos Code Next demo will be exhibited at the same booth as soon as the latest update title of the first game is over at the KGP division of FKDigital on April 30, 2022.

Gameplay 
The game uses a standard 8-way lever and four button (weak punch, weak kick, strong punch, strong kick) system. Characters can be customized prior to the fight, such as selecting two "edit special moves" from four possibilities to go along with the character's built-in attacks. Players can also select between "run" and "step" modes, placing the focus respectively on speed and technical play.
The game makes use of a couple of systems that can quickly change the flow of battle:
Destruction Chaos: A high level super move that, if successfully connects, can eliminate half of the opponent's life gauge.
Exceed Chaos: Place the character into a special status which removes limitations on combos.

Characters

(New) Sign of Catastrophe 
 Bravo Peperoncine
 Cait & Sith Whisker
 Celia
 Celia II Kai
 Cerberus Black
 Cthylla
 Heihachi “Catherine” Katori
 Hermes Gberardini
 Hikaru Otagi
 MG Hikaru Otagi
 Kagari
 Kudlak-Sin
 Lupinus
 Ray
 Rui Mishima
 Vein the Rakshasa

Next Episode of Xtreme Tempest 
 Gou
 Undead musician fighter
 Blue haired priest fighter

 - Added in New update
 - Originally unplayable prior to console release, onward
 - Hidden character

Home version 
A port of the game for the PlayStation 3 included several changes for the home release, including a Training mode, a Versus mode and a Gallery mode. This version also features additional characters, balance adjustments, new game modes, and has made the arcade version's last boss, Kudlak-Sin, a playable character. This version was first released as an online download on Hong Kong's PSN in 2012, and has subsequently also been released in both Japan and North America in 2013 and Europe in 2014.

References

External links 
Chaos Code -Sign of Catastrophe-
Official websites for Arcade  and PlayStation 3 releases
Chaos Code -New Sign of Catastrophe-
Official websites for Arcade , PC, and PlayStation 4 releases

2011 video games
Arcade video games
Arc System Works games
Doujin video games
Fantasy video games
Fighting games
NESiCAxLive games
Nintendo Switch games
PlayStation 3 games
PlayStation 4 games
PlayStation Network games
Science fantasy video games
Video games developed in Japan
Windows games
Multiplayer and single-player video games